Novovoskresenskoye is a rural locality (a village) in Karinskoye Rural Settlement, Alexandrovsky District, Vladimir Oblast, Russia. The population was 21 as of 2010. There are 12 streets.

Geography 
Novovoskresenskoye is located 27 km southwest of Alexandrov (the district's administrative centre) by road. Lizunovo is the nearest rural locality.

References 

Rural localities in Alexandrovsky District, Vladimir Oblast
Alexandrovsky Uyezd (Vladimir Governorate)